The Western Isles representative team is the representative football team for the Western Isles, Scotland. They are not affiliated with FIFA or UEFA. Most players selected either play in the Lewis and Harris Football League or the Uist & Barra Football League. The team has participated in several Island Games tournaments since 2005.

Island Games record

N.B. Football was not played at the 2019 games due to lack of pitches in Gibraltar. A replacement tournament was held in Anglesey where the team came 9th.

Selected internationals

Notable players

 Eachainn Miller - played for Stirling University

References

Western Isles
Amateur association football in Scotland
National football team
National football team
Amateur association football teams